Sophora is a genus of about 45 species of small trees and shrubs in the pea family Fabaceae. The species have a pantropical distribution. The generic name is derived from sophera, an Arabic name for a pea-flowered tree.

The genus formerly had a broader interpretation including many other species now treated in other genera, notably Styphnolobium (pagoda tree genus), which differs in lacking nitrogen fixing bacteria (rhizobia) on the roots, and Dermatophyllum (the mescalbeans). Styphnolobium has galactomannans as seed polysaccharide reserve, in contrast Sophora contains arabinogalactans, and Dermatophyllum amylose.

The New Zealand Sophora species are known as kowhai.

The seeds of species such as Sophora affinis and Sophora chrysophylla are reported to be poisonous.

Fossil record
One Sophora fossil seed pod from the middle Eocene epoch has been described from the Miller clay pit in Henry County, Tennessee, United States.

Species
Sophora comprises the following species:

 Sophora albescens 
 Sophora albo-petiolulata 
 Sophora alopecuroides —sophora root
 Sophora bakeri 
 Sophora benthamii 
 Sophora brachygyna 
 Sophora cassioides —Pelú (Chile)
 Sophora chathamica —coastal kowhai (New Zealand)
 Sophora chrysophylla —Māmane (Hawaii)
 Sophora davidii 
 Sophora denudata 
 Sophora dunnii 
 Sophora exigua 
 Sophora fernandeziana  (Juan Fernández Islands)
 var. fernandeziana 
 var. reedeana 
 Sophora flavescens —ku shen (Eastern Asia)
 var. flavescens 
 var. galegoides 
 var. kronei 
 Sophora franchetiana 
 Sophora fraseri 
 Sophora fulvida —Waitakere kowhai (New Zealand)
 Sophora godleyi—Godley kowhai, papa kowhai (New Zealand)
 Sophora howinsula —lignum vitae, Lord Howe kowhai
 Sophora inhambanensis 
 Sophora interrupta 
 Sophora jaubertii 
 Sophora koreensis  – Korean necklace pod
 Sophora lanaiensis 
 Sophora leachiana 
 Sophora linearifolia 
 Sophora longicarinata —limestone kowhai (New Zealand)
 Sophora longipes 
 Sophora macrocarpa —mayo or mayú (Chile)
 Sophora mangarevaensis  (French Polynesia)
 Sophora masafuerana  (Juan Fernández Islands)
 Sophora microcarpa 
 Sophora microphylla —small-leaved kowhai (New Zealand)
 Sophora molloyi—Cook Strait Kowhai (New Zealand)
 Sophora mollis 
 subsp. griffithii 
 subsp. mollis 
 Sophora moorcroftiana 
 Sophora nuttalliana 
 Sophora pachycarpa 
 Sophora polyphylla 
 Sophora praetorulosa 
 Sophora prazeri 
 var. mairei 
 var. prazeri 
 Sophora prostrata —dwarf kowhai, prostrate kowhai (New Zealand)
 Sophora raivavaeensis  (French Polynesia)
 Sophora rapaensis  (French Polynesia)
 Sophora rhynchocarpa 
 Sophora saxicola  (Jamaica)
 Sophora secundiflora, a popular landscape plant, was reclassified to Dermatophyllum secundiflorum.
 Sophora stenophylla 
 Sophora tetraptera —large-leaved kowhai, Taupo kowhai (New Zealand)
 Sophora tomentosa —necklace pod (Pantropical on coasts)
 subsp. littoralis 
 subsp. occidentalis 
 subsp. tomentosa 
 Sophora tonkinensis 
 Sophora toromiro —toromiro (Easter Island)
 Sophora unifoliata 
 Sophora velutina 
 subsp. cavaleriei 
 subsp. velutina 
 subsp. zimbabweensis 
 Sophora violacea 
 Sophora wightii  (India)
 Sophora xanthoantha 
 Sophora yunnanensis 
 Sophora zeylanica

Species names with uncertain taxonomic status
The status of the following species is unresolved:

 Sophora albicans 
 Sophora ambigua 
 Sophora angulata 
 Sophora angustifolia 
 Sophora biflora 
 Sophora biflora 
 Sophora buxifolia 
 Sophora chathamica 
 Sophora coerulea 
 Sophora cuneifolia 
 Sophora davidii 
 Sophora donihuensis 
 Sophora genistaefolia 
 Sophora genistoides 
 Sophora glabra 
 Sophora glabra 
 Sophora godleyi 
 Sophora grandiflora 
 Sophora grisea 
 Sophora hirsuta 
 Sophora houghiana 
 Sophora howinsula 
 Sophora jabandas 
 Sophora juncea 
 Sophora ludovice-Adecim-Asexta 
 Sophora mangarevaensis 
 Sophora mecosperma 
 Sophora molloyi 
 Sophora molokaiensis 
 Sophora mutabilis 
 Sophora myrtillifolia 
 Sophora oblongata 
 Sophora oblongifolia 
 Sophora oligophylla 
 Sophora pendula 
 Sophora pentaphylla 
 Sophora persica 
 Sophora praetorulosa 
 Sophora raivavaeensis 
 Sophora rapaensis 
 Sophora robinoides 
 Sophora senegalensis 
 Sophora sibirica 
 Sophora sinica 
 Sophora sinuata 
 Sophora sororia 
 Sophora sumatrana 
 Sophora sylvatica 
 Sophora tetraptera 
 Sophora tiloebsis 
 Sophora tiloensis 
 Sophora trifolia 
 Sophora triphylla 
 Sophora vanioti 
 Sophora vestita 
 Sophora viciifolis

References

External links

 Sophora macrocarpa pictures from Chilebosque

 
Fabaceae genera
Taxa named by Carl Linnaeus